Grey oak or gray oak may refer to:

 Casuarina glauca
 Grevillea hilliana
 Several species of Quercus including:
Quercus grisea
Quercus leucotrichophora, see List of Quercus species
Quercus turbinella

See also 
 Gray's oak, Quercus ambigua, a synonym of Quercus diversifolia